Lust and Revenge is a 1996 film directed by Paul Cox. It was shot in South Australia.

References

External links

Lust and Revenge at Urban Cinefile
Lust and Revenge at Oz Movies
Lust and Revenge at Paul Cox's website

1986 films
Films directed by Paul Cox
1996 comedy-drama films
1996 films
Australian comedy-drama films
1990s English-language films
1980s English-language films
1990s Australian films